IV is the fourth studio album by American country music band Diamond Rio. It produced the Top 5 singles "Walkin' Away", "That's What I Get for Lovin' You" and "Holdin'", as well as the #15 "It's All in Your Head". "She Misses Him on Sunday the Most" was released as a single in Germany only. The album itself was certified gold in the United States.

Track listing

Personnel 
Diamond Rio
 Marty Roe – lead vocals
 Dan Truman – keyboards
 Jimmy Olander – acoustic guitars, electric guitars
 Gene Johnson – mandolin, backing vocals
 Dana Williams – bass, backing vocals
 Brian Prout – drums

Additional musicians
 Carl Marsh – digital programming

Production 
 Diamond Rio – producers
 Tim DuBois – producer 
 Mike Clute – producer, engineer, mixing 
 Art Gillespie – additional engineer, assistant engineer 
 Matt Svobodny – additional engineer, assistant engineer 
 Pete Miskinis – assistant engineer 
 Glenn Meadows – digital editing, mastering 
 Jennifer C. Rose – production assistant 
 Maude Gilman – art direction, design 
 S. Wade Hunt – design 
 Bret Lopez – photography 
 John Scarpati – photography

Studios
 Recorded at Midtown Tone & Volume (Nashville, Tennessee).
 Mixed, Edited and Mastered at Masterfonics (Nashville, Tennessee).

Charts

Weekly charts

Year-end charts

Certifications

References

Arista Records albums
Diamond Rio albums
1996 albums